The  is a botanical garden located in the skiing region near Mount Dainichi in the Takasu area of the city of Gujō, Gifu Prefecture, Japan.

See also 
 List of botanical gardens in Japan

References 
 Hirugano Botanical Garden 
 Sightseeing Map of Gujo, Gifu
 Takasu Map

Botanical gardens in Japan
Gardens in Gifu Prefecture
Gujō, Gifu